Conde S. Januário Hospital (CHCSJ) is an acute care district general hospital run by the public sector in Sé (Cathedral Parish), Macau.

Established in 1874 and extended in 1989, it has 476 beds and offers 22 different services, both for inpatients and for outpatients. The hospital is colloquially known as 'Hill-top Hospital' (山頂醫院) by the majority of local people. Herein, the 'Hill' refers to the Guia Hill (東望洋山 or 松山).

Till 2019 there was no western-style medical school in Macau, so all indigenous intending doctors have to qualify outside of Macau. Alternatively, qualified doctors could to be brought in from outside. Macau University of Science and Technology started a medical school in Macau in September 2019 for its MBBS program. The second batch of students started their classes on 21 September 2020. Clinical training of medical students will start from third year of medical training in the university hospital associated with the university. The medical school has been listed in the world directory of medical schools. Medium of instruction in the medical school is English. Most of the students are from Macau. The duration of MBBS course is 5 years with an additional year for internship.

The hospital is accredited by The Australian Council on Healthcare standards (ACHS) from 2012.

Departments

 Out-patient Consultations 
 Emergency department
 Operation Block 
 Intensive Care Unit 
 Burns Unit 
 Physical and Rehabilitation Medicine 
 Imagiology 
 Laboratories

See also
Healthcare in Macau
International healthcare accreditation
List of hospitals in Macau
List of hospitals in China

References

External links

 Macau Health Bureau 
 Macau Health Bureau 
 

Hospitals in Macau
Hospital buildings completed in 1989
Hospitals established in 1989
Hospitals established in 1874
1874 establishments in the Portuguese Empire